The Taylorian Lecture, sometimes referred to as the "Special Taylorian Lecture" or "Taylorian Special Lecture", is a prestigious annual lecture on Modern European Literature, delivered at the Taylor Institution in the University of Oxford since 1889.

1889-1899
The first eleven lectures were published collectively in 1900, under the title Studies in European Literature, being the Taylorian Lectures 1889—1899:
1889: Edward Dowden, “Literary Criticism in France”
1890: Walter Pater, “Prosper Mérimée”
1891: W. M. Rossetti, “Leopardi”
1892: T. W. Rolleston, “Lessing and Modern German Literature”
1893 (delivered 1894): Stéphane Mallarmé, “La musique et les lettres” (Music and Literature)
1894: Alfred Morel-Fatio, “L'Espagne du Don Quijote” 
1895: H. R. F. Brown, “Paolo Sarpi”
1896 (delivered 1897): Paul Bourget, “Gustave Flaubert”
1897: C. H. Herford, “Goethe’s Italian Journey”
1898: Henry Butler Clarke, “The Spanish Rogue-Story”
1899 (delivered 1900): W. P. Ker, “Boccaccio”

1900-1920
Further lectures were delivered in the first few years of the 20th century, but were not published collectively:
1900: Émile Verhaeren, "La poésie française actuelle"
1901: Arthur Anthony Macdonell, "The Wit and Pathos of Heinrich Heine"
1902: James Fitzmaurice-Kelly, “Lope De Vega and Spanish Drama”
1903: Henry Calthrop Hollway-Calthrop, “Francesco Petrarcha”
1904: George Saintsbury, “Théophile Gautier: a French Man of Letters of All Work”

1920-1930
In 1917 a new endowment for an annual lecture on "subjects connected to Modern European Literature" was established by a donation of War Stock by Professors Charles Firth and Joseph Wright. This second series of lectures began in 1920. In 1930 a further volume of lectures was published, from the years 1920-1930, under the title Studies in European Literature, being the Taylorian Lectures Second Series, 1920—1930:
1920: Edmund Gosse, “Malherbe and the Classical Reaction in the Seventeenth Century”
1921: Francis Yvon Eccles, “Racine in England”
1922: Sir Henry Thomas, “Shakespeare and Spain”
1923: Edmund Garratt Gardner, “Tommaso Campanella and His Poetry”
1924: John George Robertson, “The Gods of Greece in German Poetry”
1925: Émile Legouis, “G. G. de Beaurieu et son Élève de la nature, 1763”
1926: John Cann Bailey, “Carducci”
1927: H. A. L. Fisher, “Paul Valéry”
1928: Abraham Flexner, “The Burden of Humanism” 
1929: Oliver Elton, “Chekhov”
1930: Percy Ewing Matheson, “German Visitors to England, 1770-1795, and their impressions”

Since 1930
Since 1930 no collected volume has been issued, but individual lectures include:
1931: Hilaire Belloc, “On Translation”
1932 (delivered 1933): George S. Gordon, “St. Evremond”
1933: Geoffrey Langdale Bickersteth, “Form, Tone, and Rhythm in Italian Poetry”
1934: Mario Roques, “La poésie Roumaine contemporaine”
1935: H. W. Garrod, “Tolstoi's Theory of Art”
1936: Herbert John Clifford Grierson, “Two Dutch Poets”
1937: Sir William Alexander Craigie, “The Art of Poetry in Iceland”
1938: Ernest Hoepffner, “Aux origines de la nouvelle française” 
1939: Edgar Allison Peers, “Antonio Machado”  
1942: Alf Sommerfelt, “The Written and Spoken Word in Norway”  
1943: Stanisław Stroński, “La poésie et la réalité aux temps des troubadours” (Poetry and reality at the time of the troubadours)
1944: Pieter Sjoerds Gerbrandy, “National and International stability: Althusius, Grotius, van Vollenhoven”
1945: Richard McGillivray Dawkins, “The Nature of the Cypriot Chronicle of Leontios Makhairas”
1946: H. J. Chaytor, “The Provençal Chanson de Geste”
1947: Leonard Ashley Willoughby, “Unity and Continuity in Goethe”
1948: John Orr, “The Impact of French upon English”
1949: Thomas Mann, “Goethe und die Demokratie”
1951: Jean Sarrailh, “La crise religieuse en Espagne à la fin du XVIIIe siècle”
1952: Bruno Migliorini, “The Contribution of the Individual to Language”
1953: Charles Bruneau, “La prose littéraire de Proust à Camus”
1954: Francis Bull, “Ibsen: The Man and the Dramatist”
1955: Sir Harold Idris Bell, “The Nature of Poetry as Conceived by the Welsh Bards”
1957: Frederick Charles Roe, “Sir Thomas Urquhart and Rabelais” 
1959: Elizabeth Mary Wilkinson, “Schiller, Poet or Philosopher?” 
1961: Cecil Maurice Bowra, “Poetry and the First World War”
1966: Edward M. Wilson, “Some Aspects of Spanish Literary History” (published 1967) 
1967: Charles Ralph Boxer, “Some Literary Sources for the History of Brazil in the Eighteenth Century”
1968: Walter Höllerer, “Elite und Utopie: Zum 100. Geburtstag Stefan Georges” (published 1969)
1971: Carlo Dionisotti, “Europe in Sixteenth-Century Italian Literature”
1974: Harry Levin, “Ezra Pound, T. S. Eliot and the European Horizon” (published 1975)
1978: R. A. Leigh, “Rousseau and the Problem of Tolerance in the Eighteenth Century”
1983: P. E. Russell, “Prince Henry the Navigator: The Rise and Fall of a Culture Hero” (published 1984)
1987: Paul Preston, “Salvador de Madariaga and the Quest for Liberty in Spain”
1992: Barry Ife, “The New World and the Literary Imagination”
2008: Jeffrey Hamburger, “Representations of Reading – Reading Representations: The Female Reader from the Hedwig Codex to Châtillon’s Léopoldine au Livre d’Heures”
2009: Maria de Fátima Silva, “Returning to the Classics in Contemporary Portuguese Drama (with special reference to Hélia Correia’s dramatic works)”
2010: Lina Bolzoni, “Of Poetry, Poets and the Magic of Mirrors in the Renaissance”

Notes

Lecture series at the University of Oxford
Recurring events established in 1889